Krążkowo may refer to the following places:
Krążkowo, Kuyavian-Pomeranian Voivodeship (north-central Poland)
Krążkowo, Lubusz Voivodeship (west Poland)
Krążkowo, Pomeranian Voivodeship (north Poland)